Rissoina ambigua is a species of minute sea snail, a marine gastropod mollusk or micromollusk in the family Rissoinidae.

Description
The shell grows to a height of 6 mm.

Distribution
This marine species occurs in the Indo-Pacific.

References

 Sheppard, A (1984). The molluscan fauna of Chagos (Indian Ocean) and an analysis of its broad distribution patterns. Coral Reefs 3: 43-50.
 Rosenberg, G. 1992. Encyclopedia of Seashells. Dorset: New York. 224 pp. page(s): 60

External links
 

Rissoinidae
Gastropods described in 1849